The 2021–22 Georgia State Panthers women's basketball team represented Georgia State University during the 2021–22 NCAA Division I women's basketball season. The basketball team, led by second-year head coach Gene Hill, played all home games, for the final season, at the GSU Sports Arena along with the Georgia State Panthers men's basketball team. They were members of the Sun Belt Conference.

Roster

Schedule and results

|-
!colspan=9 style=| Non-conference Regular Season
|-

|-
!colspan=9 style=| Conference Regular Season
|-

|-
!colspan=9 style=| Sun Belt Tournament

See also
 2021–22 Georgia State Panthers men's basketball team

References

Georgia State Panthers women's basketball seasons
Georgia State Panthers
Georgia State Panthers women's basketball
Georgia State Panthers women's basketball